The Larry Monroe Forever Bridge is a bridge mural and memorial to Austin broadcaster and musical scholar Larry Monroe. The bridge's two low walls are decorated with mosaic tiles relating to Monroe and the music he played on Austin radio for more than 30 years. Artist Stefanie Distefano designed and directed the project. The bridge is located on East Side Drive as it crosses Blunn Creek between Stacy Park and Little Stacy Park in the Travis Heights neighborhood in South Austin, Texas.

History 
An Austin radio disc jockey for more than thirty years, Monroe promoted Austin singer-songwriters and Austin-produced music on his programs. After he died in January 2014, his fans and friends wanted to honor his life and his contribution to music in Austin. His companion, Ave Bonar, suggested the idea for the mosaic bridge and commissioned mosaic artist Stefanie Distefano to design the project. Together they supervised over 100 volunteers who fabricated mosaic tiles made to look like radios, cassette tapes, ceramic portraits, and dozens of other representations of Monroe’s life and career, including replicas of his signature Segway license plate and a replica of the logo featured on his website, designed by artist Sam Hurt. The bridge features tiles depicting vinyl records with names of artists and songs that represent the range of music that Monroe enjoyed, as well as tiles containing lyrics by a few of the musicians whose music he played, including a 22-foot musical score from the Townes Van Zandt song To Live Is to Fly. The project was supported by the Austin Art in Public Places program, the Austin Arts Commission, the South River City Citizens, and private donations.

On June 18, 2015, the Austin City Council passed resolution No.20150618-086, officially naming the bridge in recognition of the legacy of Larry Monroe. At a dedication ceremony on June 20, 2015, Mayor Pro Tem Kathie Tovo accepted the artwork on behalf of the City of Austin.

Partial list of mosaic tiles

 Austin Lounge Lizards
 Marcia Ball
 Joe Ely
 Blaze Foley
 Butch Hancock
 Stevie Ray Vaughan
 Doug Sahm†
 Darden Smith 
 Townes Van Zandt 
 Carolyn Wonderland 
 David Rodriguez
 Fred Neil
 Jennifer Warneswith Doyle Bramhall 
 Jimmie Dale Gilmore 
 Kent Dykes 
 Kimmie Rhodes 
 Laurie Freelove
 Leeann Atherton
 Uncle Walt's Band
 Carrie Rodriguez
 Sara Hickman
 Greezy Wheels
 Steven Fromholz
 Beto y Los Fairlanes
 Christine Albert
 James Cotton
 Chuck Berry
 Johnny Cash
 Nervous Norvus
 The Big Bopper
 Unknown Hinson
 Tony Joe White
 Junior Brown
 Sonny Boy Williamson II
 Lavelle White

Events
Friends of Monroe and guest musicians meet at the bridge annually, near the end of August, the anniversary of Monroe's birth, to perform and celebrate his life.

See also
 South River City, Austin, Texas
 South Congress

Notes
deceased

References

External links
 Artist Stefanie Distefano
 Artist Tresha Barger
 Artist Julie Ahmad
 Larry Monroe Forever Bridge on Atlas Obscura
 Larry Monroe Forever Bridge on Public Art Archive
 Before the Bridge by Ave Bonar

Monroe
Landmarks in Austin, Texas
Monuments and memorials in Texas
Tourist attractions in Austin, Texas
Culture of Austin, Texas
Public art in Austin, Texas